Apotoforma is a genus of moths belonging to the subfamily Tortricinae of the family Tortricidae.

Species
Apotoforma apatela (Walsingham, 1914)
Apotoforma cimelia (Diakonoff, 1960)
Apotoforma cydna Razowski, 1993
Apotoforma dolosa (Walsingham, 1914)
Apotoforma epacticta Razowski & Becker, 1984
Apotoforma fustigera Razowski, 1986
Apotoforma hodgesi Razowski, 1993
Apotoforma jamaicana Razowski, 1964
Apotoforma kakamegae Razowski, 2012
Apotoforma mayumbeana Razowski, 2012
Apotoforma monochroma (Walsingham, 1897)
Apotoforma negans (Walsingham, 1897)
Apotoforma ptygma Razowski, 1993
Apotoforma rotundipennis (Walsingham, 1897)
Apotoforma smaragdina Bippus, 2020
Apotoforma uncifera Razowski, 1964
Apotoforma viridans Razowski & Becker, 2003

See also
List of Tortricidae genera

References

Bippus, M., 2020. Records of Lepidoptera from the Malagasy region with description of new species (Lepidoptera: Tortricidae, Noctuidae, Alucitidae, Choreutidae, Euteliidae, Gelechiidae, Blastobasidae, Pterophoridae, Tonzidae, Tineidae, Praydidae, Cosmopterigidae, Batrachedridae). - Phelsuma 28: 60-100 
 , 2005: World Catalogue of Insects vol. 5 Tortricidae.
 , 1964: Discussion of Some Groups of Tortricini (Tortricidae, Lepidoptera) with Descriptions of New Genera and Species. Acta Zoologica Cracoviensia, 9 (5): 357–416.
 , 1986: The Data on Tortricini (Lepidoptera, Tortricidae) published after 1966. Acta Zoologica Cracoviensia 29 (19): 423–440.
 , 1993: Revision of Apotoforma Busk, 1932 (Lepidoptera: Tortricidae), with descriptions of four other Tortricini species. Acta Zoologica Cracoviensia 36 (1): 183–197.
 , 2012: Tortricidae (Lepidoptera) from the Tervuren Museum: 1. Tortricini and Chlidanotini. Polish Journal of Entomology'' 81 (2): 129–143. Abstract and full article: .

External links
Tortricid.net

Tortricini
Tortricidae genera